James Edward Minshall (born July 4, 1947 in Covington, Kentucky) is former Major League Baseball pitcher. Jim Minshall compiled a career record of 59 wins and 53 losses, with 20 saves, and a 3.70 ERA in his 290-game pitching career with the Pittsburgh Pirates, Salem Pirates, Clinton Pilots, Salem Rebels, Sherbrooke Pirates, Thetford Mines Pirates and Charleston Charlies. He began playing during the 1966 season and last took the field during the 1976 campaign. Jim attended Newport Central Catholic High School in Newport,KY and has 5 children.

External links

1947 births
Living people
Baseball players from Kentucky
Pittsburgh Pirates players
Major League Baseball pitchers
Charleston Charlies players
Clinton Pilots players
Florida Instructional League Pirates players
Salem Pirates players
Salem Rebels players
Sherbrooke Pirates players
Thetford Mines Pirates players
American expatriate baseball players in Canada